A Distant Thunder is the third album by American heavy metal band Helstar, released by Metal Blade Records in September 1988, their first album on the label and found the band perfecting their signature mix of power metal and thrash metal. It includes a cover of Scorpions' "He's a Woman, She's a Man", appearing on their 1977 album Taken by Force.

Track listing

Personnel
James Rivera – vocals
Larry Barragan – guitars
André Corbin – guitars
Jerry Abarca – bass, keyboards
Frank Ferreira – drums

References

1988 albums
Metal Blade Records albums
Helstar albums